In mathematics, an algebraic function is a function that can be defined 
as the root of a polynomial equation. Quite often algebraic functions are algebraic expressions using a finite number of terms, involving only the algebraic operations addition, subtraction, multiplication, division, and raising to a fractional power. Examples of such functions are:
 
 
 

Some algebraic functions, however, cannot be expressed by such finite expressions (this is the Abel–Ruffini theorem). This is the case, for example, for the Bring radical, which is the function implicitly defined by

 .

In more precise terms, an algebraic function of degree  in one variable  is a function  that is continuous in its domain and satisfies a polynomial equation

 

It can be shown that the same class of functions is obtained if algebraic numbers are accepted for the coefficients of the 's. If transcendental numbers occur in the coefficients the function is, in general, not algebraic, but it is algebraic over the field generated by these coefficients.

The value of an algebraic function at a rational number, and more generally, at an algebraic number is always an algebraic number.
Sometimes, coefficients  that are polynomial over a ring  are considered, and one then talks about "functions algebraic over ".

A composition of transcendental functions can give an algebraic function:  .

As a polynomial equation of degree n has up to n roots (and exactly n roots over an algebraically closed field, such as the complex numbers), a polynomial equation does not implicitly define a single function, but up to n
functions, sometimes also called branches. Consider for example the equation of the unit circle:

This determines y, except only up to an overall sign; accordingly, it has two branches:

An algebraic function in m variables is similarly defined as a function  which solves a polynomial equation in m + 1 variables:

It is normally assumed that p should be an irreducible polynomial.  The existence of an algebraic function is then guaranteed by the implicit function theorem.

Formally, an algebraic function in m variables over the field K is an element of the algebraic closure of the field of rational functions K(x1, ..., xm).

Algebraic functions in one variable

Introduction and overview 
The informal definition of an algebraic function provides a number of clues about their properties.  To gain an intuitive understanding, it may be helpful to regard algebraic functions as functions which can be formed by the usual algebraic operations: addition, multiplication, division, and taking an nth root.  This is something of an oversimplification; because of the fundamental theorem of Galois theory, algebraic functions need not be expressible by radicals.

First, note that any polynomial function  is an algebraic function, since it is simply the solution y to the equation

More generally, any rational function  is algebraic, being the solution to

Moreover, the nth root of any polynomial  is an algebraic function, solving the equation

Surprisingly, the inverse function of an algebraic function is an algebraic function.  For supposing that y is a solution to

for each value of x, then x is also a solution of this equation for each value of y.  Indeed, interchanging the roles of x and y and gathering terms,

Writing x as a function of y gives the inverse function, also an algebraic function.

However, not every function has an inverse.  For example, y = x2 fails the horizontal line test: it fails to be one-to-one.  The inverse is the algebraic "function" . 
Another way to understand this, is that the set of branches of the polynomial equation defining our algebraic function is the graph of an algebraic curve.

The role of complex numbers 
From an algebraic perspective, complex numbers enter quite naturally into the study of algebraic functions.  First of all, by the fundamental theorem of algebra, the complex numbers are an algebraically closed field.  Hence any polynomial relation p(y, x) = 0  is guaranteed to have at least one solution (and in general a number of solutions not exceeding the degree of p in y) for y at each point x, provided we allow y to assume complex as well as real values.  Thus, problems to do with the domain of an algebraic function can safely be minimized.

Furthermore, even if one is ultimately interested in real algebraic functions, there may be no means to express the function in terms of addition, multiplication, division and taking nth roots without resorting to complex numbers (see casus irreducibilis).  For example, consider the algebraic function determined by the equation

Using the cubic formula, we get

For  the square root is real and the cubic root is thus well defined, providing the unique real root. On the other hand, for  the square root is not real, and one has to choose, for the square root, either non-real square root. Thus the cubic root has to be chosen among three non-real numbers. If the same choices are done in the two terms of the formula, the three choices for the cubic root provide the three branches shown, in the accompanying image.

It may be proven that there is no way to express this function in terms of nth roots using real numbers only, even though the resulting function is real-valued on the domain of the graph shown.

On a more significant theoretical level, using complex numbers allows one to use the powerful techniques of complex analysis to discuss algebraic functions.  In particular, the argument principle can be used to show that any algebraic function is in fact an analytic function, at least in the multiple-valued sense.

Formally, let p(x, y) be a complex polynomial in the complex variables x and y.  Suppose that
x0 ∈ C is such that the polynomial p(x0, y) of y has n distinct zeros.  We shall show that the algebraic function is analytic in a neighborhood of x0.  Choose a system of n non-overlapping discs Δi containing each of these zeros.  Then by the argument principle

By continuity, this also holds for all x in a neighborhood of x0.  In particular, p(x, y) has only one root in Δi, given by the residue theorem:

which is an analytic function.

Monodromy 
Note that the foregoing proof of analyticity derived an expression for a system of n different function elements fi(x), provided that x is not a critical point of p(x, y).  A critical point is a point where the number of distinct zeros is smaller than the degree of p, and this occurs only where the highest degree term of p vanishes, and where the discriminant vanishes.  Hence there are only finitely many such points c1, ..., cm.

A close analysis of the properties of the function elements fi near the critical points can be used to show that the  monodromy cover is ramified over the critical points (and possibly the point at infinity).  Thus the holomorphic extension of the fi has at worst algebraic poles and ordinary algebraic branchings over the critical points.

Note that, away from the critical points, we have

since the fi are by definition the distinct zeros of p.  The monodromy group acts by permuting the factors, and thus forms the monodromy representation of the Galois group of p.  (The monodromy action on the universal covering space is related but different notion in the theory of Riemann surfaces.)

History 

The ideas surrounding algebraic functions go back at least as far as René Descartes.  The first discussion of algebraic functions appears to have been in Edward Waring's 1794 An Essay on the Principles of Human Knowledge in which he writes:
let a quantity denoting the ordinate, be an algebraic function of the abscissa x, by the common methods of division and extraction of roots, reduce it into an infinite series ascending or descending according to the dimensions of x, and then find the integral of each of the resulting terms.

See also
 Algebraic expression
 Analytic function
 Complex function
 Elementary function
 Function (mathematics)
 Generalized function
 List of special functions and eponyms
 List of types of functions
 Polynomial
 Rational function
 Special functions
 Transcendental function

References

External links

Definition of "Algebraic function" in the Encyclopedia of Math

Definition of "Algebraic function"  in David J. Darling's Internet Encyclopedia of Science

Analytic functions
Functions and mappings
Meromorphic functions
Special functions
Types of functions
Polynomials